Carlos María Morales Maeso (born 1 March 1970 in Montevideo) is a former Uruguayan footballer. and he resigned as manager of Liga MX club San Luis in March 2013.

Club career
Morales spent most of his career in Uruguay, Chile and Mexico, notably playing for River Plate (URU) in the Primera División Uruguaya as well as Toluca and Atlas in the Primera División de México.

International career
Morales made seven appearances for the senior Uruguay national football team during 2001.

References

External links
 

1970 births
Living people
Uruguayan footballers
Uruguay international footballers
2001 Copa América players
Uruguayan Primera División players
Liga MX players
Ecuadorian Serie A players
Club Atlético River Plate (Montevideo) players
Defensor Sporting players
Danubio F.C. players
Montevideo Wanderers F.C. players
O'Higgins F.C. footballers
Unión Española footballers
Everton de Viña del Mar footballers
Deportivo Toluca F.C. players
San Luis F.C. players
Atlas F.C. footballers
Club Puebla players
Tecos F.C. footballers
L.D.U. Quito footballers
Footballers from Montevideo
Uruguayan expatriate footballers
Expatriate footballers in Chile
Expatriate footballers in Mexico
Expatriate footballers in Ecuador
Uruguayan expatriate sportspeople in Ecuador
Uruguayan football managers
Association football forwards
River Plate Montevideo managers